Bohemannia piotra is a moth of the family Nepticulidae. It is found in the Russian Far East (Primorskiy Kray).

The larvae feed on Malus mandshurica. They probably mine the leaves of their host plant.

Taxonomy
It was previously treated as a synonym of Bohemannia pulverosella.

References

Moths described in 1984
Nepticulidae
Moths of Asia